McKay Park is a  park in Bend, Oregon, in the United States. Named after Clyde McKay, the park opened in May 2000.

References

2000 establishments in Oregon
Parks in Bend, Oregon